This is a list of regional Skånetrafiken bus routes in Skåne County, Sweden - as well as adjacent counties, as some routes cross the border to nearby municipalities outside of the county. Skånetrafiken operates over 100 regular regional bus services, as well as seven express services called "SkåneExpressen". In addition, there are other routes that are operated only upon pre-order.

Since December 2021, Skånetrafiken operates some of its regional bus routes with fully electric buses.

List of routes

As of timetables in August 2022.

See also
Skånetrafiken

References

External links
Skånetrafiken official website
Time tables for regional bus routes in Skåne County

Skåne County